Louis Marlio (February 3, 1878 – November 26, 1952) was a French economist.

Life
He participated in the Colloque Walter Lippmann where he defended a social liberalism which favored a degree of state regulation over public services, social protection, and fiscal redistribution policies. He also admired radical and socialist politicians such as Aristide Briand.

Principal works
 Études sur les aspects économiques des différentes ententes industrielles et internationales (1930)
 La Véritable Affaire de Panama (1932)
 L'Armistice de Versailles (1935)
 Le Sort du capitalisme, Flammarion, Bibliothèque de philosophie scientifique (1938)
 Dictature ou liberté, Flammarion, Bibliothèque de philosophie scientifique (1940)
 La Révolution d'hier, d'aujourd'hui et de demain (1943)
 The Control of Germany and Japan (1944)
 Le Libéralisme social (Conférence à la Société d'Économie Politique, 1946))
 The Aluminium Cartel (1947)

References 

20th-century French economists
1878 births
1952 deaths
Member of the Mont Pelerin Society
Members of the Académie des sciences morales et politiques
École Polytechnique alumni
Collège Stanislas de Paris alumni